The Late Edwina Black (U.S. Obsessed) is a 1951 British drama film, directed by Maurice Elvey and starring David Farrar, Geraldine Fitzgerald and Roland Culver.  The film is a melodramatic murder mystery set in the Victorian era and was adapted from a stage play by William Dinner and William Morum. It was made at Isleworth Studios. The sets were designed by the art director George Provis while the costumes were by Elizabeth Haffenden.

Plot
The domineering Edwina Black has just died, and the general feeling appears to be of relief.  The local community whispers that her death is a blessing for all concerned, particularly her henpecked widower Gregory (Farrar) and downtrodden personal companion Elizabeth (Fitzgerald).  Unknown to anybody, Gregory and Elizabeth have been lovers for some time, and matters take a serious turn when the local doctor, feeling uneasy about Edwina's sudden and unexpected death, orders a post-mortem. It reveals that Edwina's body is full of arsenic.

Inspector Martin (Culver) has been instructed to get to the bottom of the case and his suspicions naturally fall on Gregory and Elizabeth, who have motive and opportunity. In the absence of proof, he sets out to trap them, hoping that they will inadvertently implicate themselves. A guidebook to Italy is found in Elizabeth's possession. How does she explain that? A complicating factor arises when it is discovered that the housekeeper Ellen (Jean Cadell) has been keeping secrets of her own, and also had good reason for wishing Edwina ill.

Martin proceeds to drop seemingly innocuous but loaded observations into the ears of the three suspects, hoping to provoke doubts and foster mutual suspicion.  This works so well that they are soon apparently falling over themselves to incriminate each other.  Martin has to try to untangle the stories to come up with a coherent picture of what actually happened, all the while being aware that he is perhaps being misdirected.

Cast
 David Farrar as Gregory Black
 Geraldine Fitzgerald as Elizabeth Graham
 Roland Culver as Inspector Martin
 Jean Cadell as Ellen
 Mary Merrall as Lady Southdale
 Harcourt Williams as Dr. Septimus Prendergast
 Ronald Adam as Headmaster
 Charles Heslop as Vicar
 Sydney Moncton as Horace

Critical reception
The New York Times called it "the most stifling and farfetched bore to snake across the Atlantic so far this year"; the Radio Times called it a "feeble Victorian whodunnit"; while Noirish wrote, "for much of the time this is all very well handled, and sometimes with some subtlety."

It was one of 15 films selected by Steve Chibnall and Brian McFarlane in The British 'B' Film, their survey of British B films, as among the most meritorious of the B films made in Britain between World War II and 1970. They noted that it "was not especially well received at the time, but has worn better than many that were". They praised the four central performers, Farrar, Cadell, Culver and Fitzgerald: "few character actresses can do mean-faced malevolence better than Jean Cadell"; and "the beautiful and underused Geraldine Fitzgerald is particularly fine".

References

External links 
 
 
 The Late Edwina Black at BFI Film & TV Database

British mystery drama films
British historical films
1951 films
1950s mystery drama films
1950s historical films
Films directed by Maurice Elvey
Films set in the Victorian era
British black-and-white films
British films based on plays
Films set in England
Films shot at Isleworth Studios
Poisoning in film
1951 drama films
1950s English-language films
1950s British films